Karl Mauss (17 May 1898 – 9 February 1959) was a German general during World War II. He commanded the 7th Panzer Division and was one of only 27 German military men to receive the Knight's Cross of the Iron Cross with Oak Leaves, Swords and Diamonds.

Career
Mauss volunteered for service in World War I in 1914 at the age of sixteen. He joined Lauenburger Jäger-Bataillon Nr. 9 of Ratzeburg, serving on the Western Front. In 1915, the youngest man in the division, he was awarded the Iron Cross, 2nd class as the best scout in the region during the Battle of the Somme. The following year, shortly after the transfer of his division to the Eastern Front, he received the Iron Cross, 1st class. Following World War I Mauss joined the paramilitary groups Freikorps Oberland and Marinebrigade Ehrhardt and fought against the Silesian Uprisings. Beginning in 1922, he studied dentistry at the University of Hamburg, attaining his doctorate in 1929 and opening a private dental practice. He re-enlisted in 1934, and reached the rank of major in April 1938.

At the start of the war, Mauss served with the 20th Motorized Infantry Division, with which he participated in the 1939 Invasion of Poland. In May 1940 his 10th Panzer Division took part in the Battle of France together with Heinz Guderian's XIX Army Corps. In the second phase of the campaign, Mauss participated in the battles against the French 7th Army.

Mauss took part in Operation Barbarossa, the invasion of the Soviet Union in June 1941. In November 1941, he was awarded the Knight's Cross of the Iron Cross. In 1942 Mauss was promoted to colonel; he was awarded the Oak Leaves to the Knight's Cross in November, 1943. In January 1944 he took command of the 7th Panzer Division. On 23 October 1944 he received the Knight's Cross with Oak Leaves and Swords. In February 1945 he was seriously injured and had a leg amputated. He was promoted to lieutenant general in April, and received the Knight's Cross with Oak Leaves, Swords, and Diamonds on 15 April 1945.

After the war Mauss worked as a dentist in his own practice. He died in 1959 following a lengthy illness.

Awards
 Iron Cross (1914) 2nd Class (16 September 1915) & 1st Class (21 October 1916)
 Clasp to the Iron Cross (1939) 2nd Class (28 September 1939) & 1st Class (25 May 1940)
 German Cross in Gold on 11 March 1943 as Oberst in the Panzergrenadier-Regiment 33
 Knight's Cross of the Iron Cross with Oak Leaves, Swords and Diamonds
 Knight's Cross on 26 November 1941 as Oberstleutnant and commander of the II./Schützen-Regiment 69
 Oak Leaves on 24 November 1943 as Oberst and commander of the Panzergrenadier-Regiment 33
 Swords on 23 October 1944 as Generalmajor and commander of the 7. Panzer-Division
 Diamonds on 15 April 1945 as Generalleutnant and commander of the 7. Panzer-Division

References

Citations

Bibliography

 
 
 
 
 

1898 births
1959 deaths
Lieutenant generals of the German Army (Wehrmacht)
German Army personnel of World War I
20th-century Freikorps personnel
Prussian Army personnel
University of Hamburg alumni
People from the Province of Schleswig-Holstein
Recipients of the Gold German Cross
Recipients of the Knight's Cross of the Iron Cross with Oak Leaves, Swords and Diamonds
Recipients of the clasp to the Iron Cross, 1st class
German prisoners of war in World War II held by the United Kingdom
German amputees
German dentists
Reichswehr personnel
20th-century dentists
Military personnel from Schleswig-Holstein